William Douglas Pawley (September 7, 1896—January 7, 1977) was a U.S. ambassador and noted businessman who was associated with the Flying Tigers American Volunteer Group (AVG) during World War II.

Early life
William Douglas Pawley was born in Florence, South Carolina on September 7, 1896. His father was a wealthy businessman based in Cuba, and young Pawley attended private schools in both Havana and Santiago. He later returned to the United States, where he studied at the Gordon Military Academy in Georgia.

Business career
In 1927, Pawley began a connection with Curtiss-Wright that would make him an extremely wealthy man. In 1928, he returned to Cuba to become president of Nacional Cubana de Aviación Curtiss, which was sold to Pan American Airlines in 1932. He then became president of Intercontinent Corporation in New York, evidently founded by Clement Keys, the former president of Curtiss. In 1933 he moved to China, where he became president of China National Aviation Corporation an airline running between Hong Kong and Shanghai. Pawley finally sold out to Pan Am again.  He later assembled aircraft in partnership with the Chinese Nationalist government under the corporate name of Central Aircraft Manufacturing Company in Hangzhou, Wuhan, and finally Loiwing on the China-Burma border. (CAMCO was owned in partnership with the Chinese government, with the Pawley family interest represented by Intercontinent, which now served as a Pawley family holding company.)

World War II
In 1940, Hindustan Aircraft Limited was set up in India with Pawley providing the initial organization.

In 1941, with his brothers Edward and Eugene, he was involved with the organization and support of the 1st American Volunteer Group, popularly known as the Flying Tigers. The brothers established an assembly plant at Mingaladon airport outside Rangoon, Burma, where the AVG's Curtiss P-40 fighter aircraft were assembled, while an Intercontinent office in Rangoon (now Yangon) provided payroll and other housekeeping services to the group while it trained upcountry at Toungoo. Later, when Allied forces were driven out of lower Burma by the Japanese, the CAMCO factory and airfield across the border in Loiwing, China, served as a base for the AVG. When Loiwing in turn was captured by Japan in May 1942, Pawley moved his operation to India as a partner in Hindustan Aircraft Limited.

Later years
Pawley was appointed as U.S. Ambassador to Peru by Harry Truman in 1945. He was named U.S. Ambassador to Brazil in 1948.

Postwar, Pawley was an active member of the Republican Party. A close friend of both President Dwight Eisenhower and Central Intelligence Agency director Allen W. Dulles, he took part in a policy that later become known as Executive Action, a plan to remove unfriendly foreign leaders from power. Pawley played a role in Operation PBSuccess, a CIA plot to overthrow the Guatemalan government of Jacobo Arbenz in 1954 after Arbenz introduced reforms affecting the United Fruit Company. Pawley is thought to have served in Peru, Brazil, Panama, Guatemala, Cuba and Nicaragua between 1945 and 1960.

Personal life
On July 25, 1919, Pawley married Annie Hahr Dobbs of Marietta, Georgia.  In 1925, the couple moved to Miami and then to Havana, Cuba, in 1928. They returned with their three children to Miami, where their youngest child was born. The Pawleys then moved to Shanghai, China, with the baby, leaving their other children in Miami Beach with family. Mrs. Pawley lived in China until 1938 with periodic trips back to Miami. They were divorced in 1941.

His final residence was in Miami Beach, Florida, where he died of a self-inflicted gunshot wound, in January 1977, because he suffered from a severe case of the very painful disease - shingles.

References
Notes

Bibliography

 Cannon, David Price. More Ruthless Than The Enemy: The Dark Diplomacy of Ambassador William Douglas Pawley (Online manuscript). williampawley.blogspot.com. Retrieved: June 4, 2011.
 Ford, Daniel. Flying Tigers: Claire Chennault and His American Volunteers, 1941-1942. Washington, DC: HarperCollins|Smithsonian Books, 2007. .
 Holland, Max. "Private Sources of U.S. Foreign Policy: William Pawley and the 1954 Coup d'État in Guatemala." Journal of Cold War Studies, Vol. 7, no. 4, Fall 2005, pp. 36–73.
 Pawley, William. Wings Over Asia. New York: self-published, 1941.
 "William D. Pawley." Life, 22 March 1943.

External links

 NameBase link (Archive)
 Roster of CAMCO personnel
 Annals of the Flying Tigers

1896 births
1977 deaths
20th-century American businesspeople
Flying Tigers
People from Florence, South Carolina
Republican Party (United States) politicians
Ambassadors of the United States to Brazil
Ambassadors of the United States to Peru
Florida Republicans
1977 suicides
Suicides by firearm in Florida
American expatriates in Cuba